Schinia oculata is a moth of the family Noctuidae. It is found in North America including Arizona and California.

The wingspan is about 23 mm.

The larvae feed on Baccharis sarothroides.

References

External links
Images
Bug Guide

Schinia
Moths of North America
Moths described in 1900